Psary  is a village in the administrative district of Gmina Trzebinia, within Chrzanów County, Lesser Poland Voivodeship, in southern Poland.

The village had a population of 1,439 at 2009.

References

External links 

Villages in Chrzanów County